Youm Kyoung-youb (born March 1, 1968) is a South Korean former baseball player and the current manager of the KBO League team LG Twins. He previously managed the Nexen Heroes and the SK Wyverns.

Youm played in the KBO from 1991 to 2000 for the Pacific Dolphins / Hyundai Unicorns franchise.

Managerial career
On June 25, 2020, during his second season as manager of the SK Wyverns, Youm collapsed in the dugout during a game. The 2020 season had been a rough one for the Wyverns, with a ten-game losing streak and an eight-game losing streak just in the first part of the year.

On November 6, 2022, he was hired as the new manager of the LG Twins on a three-year contract.

References

External links 
Career statistics and player information from Korea Baseball Organization

1968 births
Living people
Sportspeople from Gwangju
Paju Yeom clan
Kiwoom Heroes coaches
Kiwoom Heroes managers
LG Twins coaches
LG Twins managers
Hyundai Unicorns players
Pacific Dolphins players
SSG Landers managers
South Korean baseball managers
South Korean baseball coaches
South Korean baseball players
KBO League infielders
Korea University alumni
South Korean Buddhists